The West Side Belt Railroad  was a standard gauge railroad incorporated July 25, 1895. It ran from Temperanceville, to Clairton, Pennsylvania, with a branch to Banksville. It acquired the Little Saw Mill Run Railroad by merger in 1897, and the Bruce and Clairton Railroad in 1901.
The railroad was bankrupt in 1908.  The line was purchased by the Pittsburgh and West Virginia Railway in 1920.

References

History of Allegheny County, Pennsylvania
Defunct Pennsylvania railroads
Transportation in Pittsburgh
Predecessors of the Norfolk and Western Railway
Railway companies established in 1895
Railway companies disestablished in 1928
1895 establishments in Pennsylvania